Rob Cohen (born March 12, 1949) is an American director and producer of film and television. Beginning his career as an executive producer at 20th Century Fox, Cohen produced and developed numerous high-profile film and television programs, including The Wiz, The Witches of Eastwick, and Light of Day until he began focusing on full-time directing in the 1990s. He directed the action films The Fast and the Furious and XXX.

Early life and career 
Robert Alan Cohen was born in New York, son of Irwin and Beatrice Franz Cohen. In 1967 he graduated from Newburgh Free Academy in Newburgh, New York, where he was president of the Punchinello drama club, member of the JV golf team, editor of the Colonnade literary magazine and a member of the National Honor Society. He attended Harvard University and graduated magna cum laude in the class of 1971, after transferring from Amherst College after two years concentrating in a cross major between anthropology and visual studies. His first endeavor in filmmaking was a commissioned recruiting film for Harvard's Admissions Office in 1970, which became his senior thesis. He is Jewish.

Upon graduation, Cohen immediately headed to Los Angeles to work as a screenwriter for Martin Jurow but soon found himself unemployed when the producer moved out of state.

After a six-month stint as a kennel boy at the Harvey Animal Hospital in West Hollywood to make ends meet, Cohen landed a job as a reader for then-agent Mike Medavoy. Six weeks into his tenure at International Famous Agency (now part of ICM), he distinguished himself by discovering an unheralded script he found in a slush pile of neglected screenplays. Recognizing its quality, commerciality and uniqueness, Cohen wrote in his coverage that it was "the great American screenplay and this will make an award-winning, major-cast, major-director film." He championed the piece relentlessly, with his own job at stake, as Medavoy said that he would try to sell it on that recommendation, but promising to fire Cohen if he could not. Universal bought it that afternoon for a record price, and it became the Academy Award winning movie The Sting (1973). Cohen still keeps the coverage framed on the wall of his office, as this gave him his first identity in Hollywood: "the kid who found The Sting."

Film career

Producing 
With a career in film and television spanning more than 40 years, Cohen has distinguished himself as a celebrated screenwriter, producer and director. In 1973, 20th Century Fox Television hired Cohen as Head of Current Programming helping out with, among other shows, the first year of the epic hit, M*A*S*H. Eager to push Fox into 'long form', Cohen cold-called the head of ABC and introduced himself as 'the head of television movies at Fox'. Barry Diller gave him a meeting where he sold two TV films on the spot, properties he had found in the voluminous books of Fox's unproduced properties. A week later, he duplicated the feat at CBS under Philip Barry. Fox president, William Edwin Self, was not happy that a junior employee had garnered these commitments without permission but grudgingly gave Cohen the title Vice President of TV Movies.

Diller recommended Cohen to his friend impresario, songwriter, producer and record label founder Berry Gordy who was looking to bring his company Motown into the film business. He and Gordy connected and he was hired to be the Executive Vice President and head of Motown's motion picture division.

Cohen went to work and developed the first Motown movie from his own idea about the burgeoning phenomenon of African American Super Models he felt was perfect for Motown star Diana Ross. He sold the package to Paramount and in 1974, the cameras rolled on Mahogany in Chicago and Rome. At the same time, he developed a unique film from the Bill Brashler novel The Bingo Long Traveling All-Stars & Motor Kings (1976) starring Billy Dee Williams, James Earl Jones and Richard Pryor. To direct, he hired a then unknown TV director John Badham to make his feature debut, a critical hit set in the 1930s Negro National League (1920–1931) (twenty years later, he and Badham would partner again to make a number of successful films at Universal Studios).

Departing Motown in 1978, Cohen went on to produce and direct films and television series, including Miami Vice, Light of Day, The Witches of Eastwick, Ironweed, and The Wiz.

On October 8, 1986, Rob Cohen was elected vice chairman of Keith Barish Productions, which produced feature films in a pact with Tri-Star Pictures, and previously served as president of the film studio.

Directing 
From 1990 onwards, Cohen moved into directing full-time. Much success followed with early 1990s films such as Dragon: The Bruce Lee Story, Dragonheart, Daylight and the Golden Globe award-winning film The Rat Pack.

At 52, Cohen had become an action director, directing the 2001 film The Fast and the Furious. The film was a hit, opening with $40 million its first weekend, starring relative unknowns Paul Walker and Vin Diesel.

With the success of The Fast and the Furious, Cohen partnered up with Diesel again the following year to direct XXX.

He then directed the science fiction action film Stealth (2005), which was a critical and commercial failure.

In 2008, he directed the third installment of The Mummy, The Mummy: Tomb of the Dragon Emperor, grossing $403 million worldwide, and he directed Blumhouse Productions' The Boy Next Door starring Jennifer Lopez in 2015.

Cohen is also a director of commercials, housed at Original Film, having made over 150 television commercials for products such Disney's Star Wars, Verizon, Ford, GM, Mercedes, Chevy, Saab and Burger King among many others.

Sexual abuse allegations 

On February 21, 2019, Cohen's daughter, Valkyrie Weather, accused Cohen of sexually assaulting her as a child, as well as sexually assaulting another woman. Weather further claimed that Cohen had taken her to visit sex workers in Thailand and the Czech Republic when she was 12, supposedly in an attempt to "turn [her] straight". Although Cohen categorically denied these claims in a later statement, Dianna Mitzner, Cohen's former wife and Weather's mother, confirmed that she had witnessed at least one incident of sexual assault against Weather as a child. Another allegation of sexual assault was published by HuffPost on September 28, 2019. Cohen's lawyer denied any wrongdoing.

On January 24, 2021, actress Asia Argento alleged that Cohen drugged her with Gamma-hydroxybutyrate and raped her during the filming of xXx. A representative of Cohen denied Argento's assault accusation as "absolutely false".

Filmography

Film 

Producer

Executive producer

Television

Music videos 
 Rammstein for "Feuer frei!" (2002)

References

External links 

 
 Rare 1989–1990 Footage of Rob Cohen Directing Dick Wolf's "Nasty Boys"

1949 births
Living people
20th-century American Jews
20th-century American male writers
20th-century American screenwriters
21st-century American Jews
21st-century American male writers
21st-century American screenwriters
Action film directors
American male screenwriters
American male television writers
American television directors
Amherst College alumni
Film directors from New York (state)
Film producers from New York (state)
Harvard College alumni
Jewish American screenwriters
Jewish American film directors
Newburgh Free Academy alumni
People from the Catskills
People from Cornwall, New York
People from Newburgh, New York
Robert Meltzer Award winners
Screenwriters from New York (state)
Television commercial directors
Television producers from New York (state)